Nikolai Robertovich Erdman (Moscow – 10 August 1970) was a Soviet dramatist and screenwriter primarily remembered for his work with Vsevolod Meyerhold in the 1920s. His plays, notably The Suicide (1928), form a link in Russian literary history between the satirical drama of Nikolai Gogol and the post-World War II Theatre of the Absurd.

Early life
Born to parents of Baltic German descent, Erdman was reared in Moscow. His brother Boris Erdman (1899–1960) was a stage designer who introduced him to the literary and theatrical milieu of Moscow. Young Erdman was particularly impressed by the grotesquely satirical poetry of Vladimir Mayakovsky, which seemed to defy all poetical conventions. At the outbreak of the Russian Civil War, he volunteered with the Red Army.

Erdman's first short poem was published in 1919. His longest and most original poetical work was Self-Portrait (1922). As a poet, Erdman aligned himself with the Imaginists, a bohemian movement led by Sergei Yesenin. In 1924, Erdman acted as a "witness for the defense" in the mock Imaginist Process. He also authored a number of witty parodies which were staged in the theatres of Moscow.

Work with Meyerhold
In 1924, Erdman submitted to Meyerhold his first major play, The Mandate. The young playwright cleverly exploited the subject of the subverted wedding to produce a work brimming with tragic absurdity. In his adaptation of the play, Meyerhold chose to emphasise the mannequin-like behaviour of Erdman's characters by introducing the tragic finale which revealed "the total and disastrous loss of identity" on the part of his characters. 

Erdman's next collaboration with Meyerhold was The Suicide (1928), "a spectacular mixture of the ridiculous and the sublime", universally recognized as one of the finest plays written during the Soviet period. The play draws on the theme of the faked suicide, which had been introduced into Russian literature by Alexander Sukhovo-Kobylin in The Death of Tarelkin (1869) and was explored by Leo Tolstoy in The Living Corpse (1900).

Erdman's masterpiece had a tortuous production history. Meyerhold's attempts to stage the play were thwarted by Soviet authorities. The Vakhtangov Theatre also failed to overcome censorship difficulties. At last Konstantin Stanislavsky sent a letter to Joseph Stalin, in which he compared Erdman to Gogol and cited Maxim Gorky's enthusiasm for the play. The permission to stage the play was granted, only to be revoked by Lazar Kaganovich's party commission on the very eve of the premiere.

Repression
His career in the theatre effectively stalled, Erdman turned his attention to the cinema. He wrote scripts for several silent films, the most famous being Boris Barnet's The House on Trubnaya. After Stanislavsky's actor Vasily Kachalov thoughtlessly recited Erdman's satirical fables to Stalin during a night party in the Kremlin, their author's fate was sealed. He was arrested when filming his first attempt at a musical, Jolly Fellows, and faced deportation to the town of Yeniseysk in Siberia (1933). The following year he was permitted to move to Tomsk, where was able to secure a job in a local theatre.

Although he was not allowed to appear in Moscow, Erdman would visit the city illegally in the 1930s. During one of such visits, he read to Mikhail Bulgakov the first act of his new play The Hypnotist (never completed). Bulgakov was so impressed by his talent that he petitioned Stalin to sanction Erdman's return to the capital. The petition was ignored, but Erdman's script for the comedy Volga-Volga was awarded the Stalin Prize for 1941.

At the outbreak of World War II, Erdman was in Ryazan with his friend and collaborator Mikhail Volpin, whom he had known since his time with Mayakovsky. As both men had a history as political prisoners, they were unable to enlist in the army in the ordinary fashion. Instead, they had to travel by foot to Tolyatti, a distance of 600 kilometers, in order to enlist in a special unit open to disenfranchised persons and former priests. In 1942, through Lavrentiy Beria's patronage, Erdman obtained a transfer to Moscow for himself and Volpin, and they spent the remainder of the war writing material for the Song and Dance Ensemble at the Central Club of the NKVD.

After the war he remained shut out of theatrical circles. With no other means of livelihood but the cinema, he turned to the most apolitical activity available, contributing scripts for children's films such as Jack Frost and It Was I Who Drew the Little Man, often in collaboration with Mikhail Volpin.

The Thaw
Erdman's perfection of dialogues and compositions was crucial in adapting Hans Christian Andersen's fairy tale to the Soviet film screens. The film The Snow Queen was cowritten by director Lev Atamanov and Georgy Grebner(ru). Of all the people in the world influenced by the movie, it would be the Japanese people that would greatly adore the film. , children's literature critic of Japan stated the film adaptation is clear and coherent in context to Andersen's story: "Therefore, the story is much more consistent and clearer than the Andersen version." It would be the acclaimed director, animator Hayao Miyazaki himself who would undoubtedly be influenced by the film and to a general extent Erdman's script. Miyazaki especially was influenced by the episode when Gerda sacrifices her shoes to the river. The subtleties of the script and animation was crucial in keeping high the spirit of the animator needed for his productions in the late 1900s.

Erdman was living in obscurity when in 1964 Yuri Lyubimov invited him to join the newly founded Taganka Theatre. Although Lyubimov and Erdman collaborated on several novel productions, aspiring to revive Meyerhold's traditions, it was not until 1990 that Lyubimov succeeded in producing his stage version of The Suicide.

Erdman's principal work was banned in the Soviet Union until the Perestroika era. Even the comparatively orthodox Moscow Satire Theatre (inaugurated in 1924 with the production of Erdman's review Moscow from the Point of View...) failed to have their version of The Suicide approved by the Soviet censors.

References

Works
N. Erdman. Пьесы. Интермедии. Письма. Документы. Воспоминания современников. Moscow, 1990.
N. Erdman / A. Stepanova, un amour en exil, correspondence 1933–35, adaptation de Lara Suyeux, traduction française Evy Vartazarmian. Triartis Editions, Paris, 2011.

External links
 

1900 births
1970 deaths
Writers from Moscow
People from Moskovsky Uyezd
Baltic-German people
20th-century Russian poets
Russian satirists
Russian dramatists and playwrights
Russian male dramatists and playwrights
Soviet dramatists and playwrights
20th-century Russian male writers
Soviet screenwriters
Soviet male poets
Soviet poets
Male screenwriters
Stalin Prize winners